, often referred as BuriMyu, are a series of rock musicals produced by Studio Pierrot and Nelke Planning. The musicals are based on Tite Kubo's manga Bleach. The Rock Musical Bleach consists of live performances that follow the manga plotline from the Soul Society arc and The Live Bankai shows with the original script. The first musical was directed by Takuya Hiramitsu, with a script adaptation by Naoshi Okumura. The music is completely original and was written by Shoichi Tama. The premiere was held in Space Zero Hall in Shinjuku, Tokyo from August 17–28, 2005.

Synopsis
The story follows the life of high school student Ichigo Kurosaki after he obtains a Soul Reaper powers from another Soul Reaper, Rukia Kuchiki. For transferring her Soul Reaper powers to a human, Rukia Kuchiki was sent back to the Soul Society and sentenced to death. In order to save Rukia from execution, Ichigo along with his friends goes to the enemy territory where he engages the members of Gotei 13, the main military force in the Soul Society.

Productions

Rock Musical Bleach
The musical was first produced under the direction of Takuya Hiramitsu at Space Zero Hall in Shinjuku, Tokyo and opened officially on August 17, 2005. The script was adapted by Naoshi Okumura and music was originally produced by Shoichi Tama. The main role of Ichigo Kurosaki went to Tatsuya Isaka. The role of Rukia Kuchiki was played by Miki Satō. Rei Yoshii portrayed Orihime Inoue and Naofumi Yoshida played the role of Yasutora Sado. The show was performed until August 28, 2005.

Saien
The second musical was performed under name "Saien" and it was officially premiered at Meil Park Hall in Osaka on January 5, 2006. The Tokyo premiere of "Saien" was held at Nippon Seinenkan Great Hall on January 14, 2006. The production added the new cast member for the show, Eiki Kitamura to play a role of Izuru Kira.

The Dark of the Bleeding Moon
The third Rock Musical Bleach was opened at Miel Park Hall in Osaka under name "The Dark of the Bleeding Moon" on August 10, 2006. In Tokyo, the musical was held at Nippon Seinenkan Great Hall on August 16, 2006. The show added Kumiko Saito to portray Yoruichi Shihōin. The production also added Kohei Murakami to portray Hanatarō Yamada, Harumi Inoue to play Rangiku Matsumoto, Shogo Suzuki to play Kenpachi Zaraki, and Takuya Usui to play Ikkaku Madarame. Yousuke Ito, Rei Yoshii and Naofumi Yoshida were removed from the original cast member list.

No Clouds in the Blue Heavens
"No Clouds in the Blue Heavens" is a sequel of previous musical and it focuses on Rukia's execution. The performance was held at Nippon Seinenkan Great Hall in Tokyo on March 21, 2007, following the next premiere at Hyōgo Theater on April 3, 2007. The show features new cast members and new songs. Asuka Sekine, Hiroko Kasahara and Masahiro Kuranuki were added to the cast.

The All
The closing musical "The All" was held at Shinjuku Koma Theater on March 24, 2008. The show is the part of "Rock Musical Bleach DX" performance and it features the complete Soul Society arc storyline from Bleach manga along with the main actors.

The Live Bankai Show
"The Live Bankai Shows" are musicals with original script and they don't follow the manga plotline. The first "Live Bankai Show Code 001" was held at Aoyama Theater in Tokyo on January 10, 2007. The next one, "Code 002" was opened at Shinjuku Koma Theater on March 24, 2008 as a part of "Rock Musical Bleach DX" show. In 2010, the third show "Code 003", was performed across the country starting at Momochi Palace in Fukuoka, following the performance at Theater Brava in Osaka and closing show at Nippon Seinenkan Great Hall in Tokyo. The shows features new songs and new cast members. Naoya Gomoto was added to portray Shūhei Hisagi while Kengo Ohkuchi didn't perform his role of Sōsuke Aizen in the third show.

Shinsei 2011 and 2012
Celebrating the Bleach manga 10th anniversary a new production under name "Shinsei" was opened in July 2011. The tour ran nationwide in six different cities. The show featured a new set of cast members along with the new script and music. The leading role of Ichigo Kurosaki was portrayed by Norizuki Kouhei. Miki Satō reprised her role of Rukia Kuchiki.

The musical was reprised at Shinagawa Stellar Ball in Tokyo on August 9, 2012. The "Shinsei 2012" performance featured the original set of cast members with addition of Oyama Masashi who portrayed Urahara Kisuke.

Another Above Ground
Celebrating the 15th anniversary of Bleach, a new production of Rock Musical Bleach was revealed in May 2016. The play was based on "The All" which was held in 2008 and the story covered the "Soul Society" Arc from the series. The musical debuted in AiiA 2.5 Theater Tokyo and ran from July 28 until August 7, 2016 before continuing their run from August 24–28, 2016 at the Kyoto Gekijō. The play was directed and written by Tsutsumi Yasuyuki who previously worked on several One Piece projects.

Musical numbers

 Act I
 "Bleach" (Overture)
 "Kanarazu Mitsuke Dasu" – Ichigo, Orihime and Chad
 "Magakoro" – Orihime
 "Taisetsuna Koto" – Ichigo, Rukia and Renji
 "Mezameta Chikara" – Urahara
 "Chad's Song" – Chad and his grandfather
 "Orihime's Song" – Orihime
 "Taikyo" – Chad and Orihime
 "Chiisana Yasuragi" – Rukia
 "Zabimaru" – Ichigo and Rukia
 "Kanarazu Mitsuke Dasu ~ Owaranai Tatakai" – Ichigo and Rukia

 Act II
 "Death Song" – Urahara
 "Kimi ga Mienai" - Hitsugaya
 "Soukonka" - Byakuya
 "Ai Tooku" - Aizen and Momo
 "Explosion" - Renji
 "Hallelujah! Goodbye! ~ Death Song Reprise"
 "Rukongai no Kioku" - Rukia and Renji
 "Shinjitsu no Yukue" - Ichimaru
 "Ugomeku Taishi" - Aizen
 "Okite Soshite Mayoi" - Rukia and Byakuya
 "Bleach Reprise" - Ichigo and Rukia
 "Aizen no Shi" - Momo and Hitsugaya
 "Taiketsu" - Ichigo and Renji
 "Tatakai ni Hitsuyouna Mono" - Urahara
 "Rukongai no Kioku Reprise" - Renji
 "Bleach Reprise" (Finale) 
 "Owaranai Kimochi" - Ichigo, everyone

Characters and cast members
The principal cast members from the original musical Rock Musical Bleach.

Recordings
Aniplex has released three albums featuring songs from the musical Rock Musical Bleach.
 Rock Musical Bleach Live (2006)
 Rock Musical Bleach - The Dark Of the Bleeding Moon Live (2007)
 Rock Musical Bleach (2008)

Reception
Rock Musical Bleach was seen by more than 130,000 people since its creation in 2005.

See also
 Rock musical
 Theatre of Japan

References

External links
 Official website 
 Rock Musical Bleach at nelke.co.jp 

Bleach (manga)
Rock musicals
2005 musicals
2.5D musicals
Musicals based on anime and manga
Japanese musicals